A special election was held in  on October 11, 1814 to fill a vacancy caused by the resignation of Jonathan Roberts (DR) upon being elected to the Senate.

Election results

Henderson took his seat on November 27, 1814.

See also
List of special elections to the United States House of Representatives

References

Pennsylvania 1814 02
Pennsylvania 1814 02
1814 02
Pennsylvania 02
United States House of Representatives 02
United States House of Representatives 1814 02